The 2022 World University Games Qualifier was held from September 22 to 25 at the RA Centre in Ottawa, Ontario. This one-time event was used to select Canada's representatives for the 2023 Winter World University Games, as the 2022 U Sports/Curling Canada University Curling Championships was cancelled due to the COVID-19 pandemic. The winning team on both the men's and women's sides will represent Canada at the 2023 Winter World University Games.

Men

Qualification
The following nations qualified to participate in the 2022 World University Games Qualifier:

Teams
The teams are listed as follows:

Round robin standings
Final Round Robin Standings

Knockout results
All draw times listed in Eastern Time (UTC-04:00).

Draw 2
Thursday, September 22, 12:30 pm

Draw 4
Thursday, September 22, 8:30 pm

Draw 6
Friday, September 23, 12:30 pm

Draw 8
Friday, September 23, 8:30 pm

Draw 10
Saturday, September 24, 1:00 pm

Playoffs

Semifinal
Saturday, September 24, 7:30 pm

Final
Sunday, September 25, 11:00 am

Women

Qualification
The following nations qualified to participate in the 2022 World University Games Qualifier:

Teams
The teams are listed as follows:

Round robin standings 
Final Round Robin Standings

Knockout results
All draw times listed in Eastern Time (UTC-04:00).

Draw 1
Thursday, September 22, 8:30 am

Draw 3
Thursday, September 22, 4:30 pm

Draw 5
Friday, September 23, 8:30 am

Draw 7
Friday, September 23, 4:30 pm

Draw 9
Saturday, September 24, 9:00 am

Playoffs

Semifinal
Saturday, September 24, 7:30 pm

Final
Sunday, September 25, 11:00 am

References

External links

2022 in Canadian curling
2022 in Ontario
World University Games Qualifier
Curling in Ottawa
2020s in Ottawa